The Sandhills or Carolina Sandhills is a 10-35 mi wide physiographic region within the U.S. Atlantic Coastal Plain province, along the updip (inland) margin of this province in the States of North Carolina, South Carolina, and Georgia. The extent of the Carolina Sandhills is shown in maps of the ecoregions of North Carolina, South Carolina, and Georgia.

Geology
The unconsolidated sand of the Carolina Sandhills is mapped as the Quaternary Pinehurst Formation, and is interpreted as eolian (wind-blown) sand sheets and dunes that were mobilized episodically from approximately 75,000 to 6,000 years ago.  Most of the published luminescence ages from the sand are coincident with the last glaciation, a time when the southeastern United States was characterized by colder air temperatures, stronger winds, and less vegetation.

The Carolina Sandhills region also contains outcrops of Cretaceous-age (~100 million years old) strata of sand, sandstone, and clay that are interpreted as fluvial (river) deposits.  These Cretaceous strata are thought to be the source of the sand of the Pinehurst Formation.  In South Carolina and North Carolina, these Cretaceous strata are mapped as the Middendorf Formation.  A notable hill of these Cretaceous strata is Sugarloaf Mountain in the Sand Hills State Forest in Chesterfield County, South Carolina.

Soils
The soils of the Carolina Sandhills are very sandy.  According to soil surveys of the U.S. Department of Agriculture, many soils of the Carolina Sandhills are mapped as the Alpin sand or Candor sand.

Vegetation
The Carolina Sandhills region is characterized by xeric sand community vegetation dominated by pine trees, which caused it to formerly be known as Carolina and Georgia's Piney Woods.

Much of the Carolina Sandhills is known for an ecosystem of longleaf pine (Pinus palustris) and wiregrass (Aristida stricta). This ecosystem is maintained by frequent low-intensity fires that facilitate the reproduction of the trees, wiregrass, and associated plants.  This ecosystem once formed one of the more extensive ecosystems in North America, and longleaf pine was once the dominant tree that covered ~60% of the Atlantic Coastal Plain and Gulf of Mexico Coastal Plain.  Today, however, only about 1% of this region supports longleaf pine.

Wildlife
More than 30 plant and animal species associated with the longleaf pine ecosystem are listed as threatened or endangered, and many of these species require interactions with the longleaf pine and with frequent low-intensity fires. The most famous endangered species of the Carolina Sandhills is probably the red-cockaded woodpecker (Picoides borealis), which prefers to excavate nesting and roosting cavities in living trees of longleaf pine that are 80–120 years old. 

Another rare species that can be found is the Pine Barrens tree frog, which are tolerant of low pH levels and often lay eggs in shallow, acidic ponds. The species can only be found in the Carolina Sandhills, Southern Alabama/Florida panhandle and the closely related ecosystem New Jersey Pine Barrens. Dryophytes andersonii is also the state amphibian of North Carolina.

Human history
Sand Hills cottage architecture is a style that developed in this area in the early to mid-1800s; it is a modified form of Greek Revival architecture. The people of the 'Piney Woods' that once covered the Sandhills and Inner Banks were known as "Goobers" around the time of the Civil War.

Preservation
The Carolina Sandhills National Wildlife Refuge in northeastern South Carolina attempts to preserve a fraction of the original Sandhills longleaf pine ecosystem.  The refuge is located in Chesterfield County near McBee.

References

External links
 Aspects of NC Climate--Carolina Sandhills—accessed 19 March 2007
 Carolina Sandhills National Wildlife Refuge—accessed 19 March 2007
 Carolina Sandhills National Wildlife Refuge (Brochure)—accessed 19 March 2007
 Carolina Sandhills National Wildlife Refuge--fire management—accessed 19 March 2007 
 Carolina Sandhills National Wildlife Refuge--flora and fauna—accessed 19 March 2007
 South Carolina Naturally—accessed 19 March 2007
  Sandhills--Nature Conservancy—accessed 19 March 2007
 Sandhills Fact Sheet—Savannah River Ecology Laboratory—accessed 19 March 2007
 South Carolina Department of Environmental Resources—Sandhills Ecoregion Terrestrial Habitat—accessed 19 March 2007.

 
Regions of North Carolina
Regions of South Carolina